Hydroginella scintilla is a species of sea snail, a marine gastropod mollusk in the family Marginellidae, the margin snails.

Description

Distribution
This species occurs in the Indian Ocean off Mauritius.

References

 Jousseaume, F., 1875. Coquilles de la famille des marginelles, Monographie. Revue et Magasin de Zoologie Pure et Appliquée 3(3): 164-278; 429-435
 Cossignani (2009). Malacologia Mostra Mondiale 65 (4) : 29 
 Boyer F. (2015). Révision du genre Hydroginella Laseron, 1957 dans les Mascareignes. Xenophora Taxonomy. 6: 9-18

Marginellidae
Gastropods described in 1875